Shefford is a former provincial electoral district in the Montérégie region of Quebec, Canada.  As of its final election, it included the cities of Granby and Waterloo.

It was created for the 1867 election (and existed prior to that in the Legislative Assembly of the Province of Canada).  Its final election was in 2008.  It disappeared in the 2012 election. The western half became Granby, while most of the eastern portion joined Brome-Missisquoi.

Members of the Legislative Assembly / National Assembly
 Michel-Adrien Bessette, Conservative Party (1867–1871)
 Maurice Laframboise, Liberal (1871–1878)
 Joseph Lafontaine, Liberal (1878–1881)
 Isidore Frégeau, Conservative Party (1881–1886)
 Thomas Brassard, Liberal (1886–1887)
 Tancrède Boucher de Grosbois, Liberal (1888–1892)
 Adolphe-François Savaria, Conservative Party (1892–1897)
 Tancrède Boucher de Grosbois, Liberal (1897–1903)
 Auguste Mathieu, Liberal (1904)
 Ludger-Pierre Bernard, Conservative Party (1904–1912)
 William Stephen Bullock, Liberal (1912–1931)
 Robert-Raoul Bachand, Liberal (1931–1935)
 Hector Choquette, Action liberale nationale - Union Nationale (1935–1939)
 Charles Munson Bullock, Liberal (1939–1944)
 Hector Choquette, Union Nationale (1944–1952)
 Gaston Ledoux, Liberal (1952–1956)
 Armand Russell, Union Nationale (1956–1973)
 Richard Verreault, Liberal (1973–1981)
 Roger Paré, Parti Québécois (1981–1994)
 Bernard Brodeur, Liberal (1994–2007)
 François Bonnardel, ADQ (2007–2012), CAQ (2012)

Election results

|-
 
|Liberal
|Jean-Claude Tremblay
|align="right"|11,201
|align="right"|34.42
|align="right"|

|-

|-

|Independent
|Lucie Piédalue
|align="right"|181
|align="right"|0.56
|align="right"|
|}

References

External links
Information
 Elections Quebec

Election results
 Election results (National Assembly)
 Election results (Elections Quebec)

Maps
 2001 map (Flash)
2001–2011 changes (Flash)
1992–2001 changes (Flash)
 Electoral map of Montérégie region (as of 2001)
 Quebec electoral map, 2001

Granby, Quebec
Former provincial electoral districts of Quebec
Waterloo, Quebec